Little Brothers – Friends of the Elderly is a network of non-profit, volunteer-based organizations located in the United States that are committed to relieving isolation and loneliness among the elderly. Little Brothers – Friends of the Elderly is a member of the International Federation of Little Brothers of the Poor (French: Fédération Internationale des petits frères des Pauvres) with sister organizations in France, Germany, Poland, Switzerland, Spain, Ireland, the United States of America and Canada. The American organization was founded 1959 following the French chapter in 1946 by Armand Marquiset.

References

External links 
 Official Website of the Little Brothers in the USA

Non-profit organizations based in the United States
Gerontology organizations

de:Les petits frères des Pauvres
fr:Petits frères des Pauvres